The women's 20 kilometres walk event at the 2015 Summer Universiade was held on 10 July at the Gwangju Universiade Main Stadium.

Medalists

Individual

Team

Results

Individual

Penalties
~ Lost contact
> Bent knee

Team

References

Walk
2015 in women's athletics
2015